José Rosa dos Santos (born 29 June 1945 in Beja) is a former Portuguese football referee. He refereed two matches in the UEFA European Football Championship, one in the 1988 tournament and one in the 1992 tournament.

References
 Profile

1945 births
Portuguese football referees
Living people
UEFA Euro 1988 referees
UEFA Euro 1992 referees
People from Beja, Portugal
Sportspeople from Beja District